Statue of Johannes Gutenberg may refer to:

 Statue of Johannes Gutenberg (Stanford University)
 Statue of Johannes Gutenberg, Strasbourg